Gulab Chand Kataria (born 13 October 1944) is an Indian politician who is serving as the 29th Governor of Assam since 2023. He was the Home minister in Government of Rajasthan from 2014 till 2018. He is a senior leader of BJP in Rajasthan and is also a member of central working committee of the party. He hails from Udaipur and has represented it in 9th Lok Sabha, the lower house of Indian Parliament. He was booked by the C.B.I. in the Sheikh fake encounter killing. He was also the Leader of Opposition in the Rajasthan Legislative Assembly from 2019 till 2023.

Early life
Kataria was born in Rajsamand. He is married to Anita Kataria and has 5 daughters.

Political career
Kataria served as the Home Minister of Rajasthan from 2004 to 2008 and again from 2014 to 2018. Kataria served as education minister in Bhairon Singh Shekhawat government between 1993 to 1998. He was MLA of Barisadri from 1993 to 2003.

Positions held

Departmental positions

Memberships of Legislature

Party Posts Held

References

External links

1944 births
Living people
Indian Hindus
Home Ministers of Rajasthan
People from Udaipur
Rajasthan MLAs 2013–2018
Bharatiya Janata Party politicians from Rajasthan
India MPs 1989–1991
State cabinet ministers of Rajasthan
Lok Sabha members from Rajasthan
Leaders of the Opposition in Rajasthan
Politicians from Udaipur
Rajasthan MLAs 1977–1980
Rajasthan MLAs 1980–1985
Rajasthan MLAs 1993–1998
Rajasthan MLAs 1998–2003
Rajasthan MLAs 2003–2008
Rajasthan MLAs 2008–2013
Rajasthan MLAs 2018–2023